The Journal of Climate is a biweekly peer-reviewed scientific journal published semi-monthly by the American Meteorological Society. It covers research that advances basic understanding of the dynamics and physics of the climate system on large spatial scales, including variability of the atmosphere, oceans, land surface, and cryosphere; past, present, and projected future changes in the climate system; and climate simulation and prediction.

See also 
List of scientific journals in earth and atmospheric sciences

External links 

Climatology journals
Publications established in 1988
English-language journals
American Meteorological Society academic journals